Night Editor is a 1946 B-movie film noir directed by Henry Levin and based on a popular radio program of the same name. The script for the film was based on a previous radio program episode "Inside Story."

The movie was to be the first in a series of films featuring stories about the graveyard-shift police beat reporters at a fictional newspaper, the New York Star, but no other Night Editor films were made.

Sony Pictures released it in the boxed set Bad Girls of Film Noir: Volume II along with Women's Prison, One Girl's Confession and Over-Exposed.

Plot
Crane Stewart (Charles D. Brown), the editor of the New York Star, while playing poker with his friends, tells a story about a cop involved in a murder investigation.

In flashback, the editor tells the tale of police lieutenant Tony Cochrane (William Gargan), a family man who cheats on his wife with socialite femme fatale Jill Merrill (Janis Carter). Cochrane and the woman, who is also cheating on her husband, witness a man bludgeoning his girlfriend to death with a tire iron while the couple is parked at "lovers lane" by the beach.

The two can't report the crime without revealing their cheating, a dilemma which eventually leads to bigger troubles. Meanwhile, Cochrane must investigate the killing but is not able to tell anyone he witnessed the crime.

Cast
 William Gargan as Lt. Tony Cochrane
 Janis Carter as Jill Merrill
 Jeff Donnell as Martha Cochrane
 Coulter Irwin as Johnny
 Roy Gordon as Benjamin Merrill
 Charles D. Brown as Crane Stewart
 Paul E. Burns as Police Lt. Ole Strom
 Harry Shamnon as Police Capt. Lawrence
 Frank Wilcox as Douglas Loring
 Robert Kellard as Doc Cochrane (as Robert Stevens)

Radio program
The radio program the film was based upon ran from 1934 until 1948.

Sponsored by Edwards Coffee, this featured Hal Burdick (1893–1978) as the "night editor". Burdick would receive readers’ requests for stories, in a "letter to the editor" format, which he would relate to the listeners. Burdick played all characters in the program. The stories varied greatly including tales of war, adventure, crime, and an occasional ghost story. The radio series was adapted for Night Editor, a short-lived TV series on the DuMont Television Network in 1954, also hosted by Burdick.

See also
 List of American films of 1946

References

External links
 
 
 
 
 
 

1946 films
1946 crime drama films
American crime drama films
American radio dramas
American black-and-white films
Columbia Pictures films
Film noir
Films about journalists
Films directed by Henry Levin
Films set in the 1930s
Films set in the 1940s
American police detective films
1940s English-language films
1940s American films